"I Just Wanna Be Loved" is the first single from English new wave band Culture Club's fifth album, Don't Mind If I Do (1999). The song was serviced to US radio in August 1998 to promote the band's reformation US tour and the live album and compilation VH1 Storytellers/Greatest Moments, but it failed to generate interest. The song was then released commercially in October 1998 and entered at  4 on the UK Singles Chart during a week when the top five positions were held by new entries for the first time. The song also became a top-20 hit in Iceland and on the Eurochart Hot 100 while reaching the top 100 in Australia and Germany.

Critical reception 
The song received positive reviews from music critics. AllMusic editor Jose F. Promis noted its "light reggae influence" in his review of Don't Mind If I Do. Larry Flick from Billboard wrote that "this fine new recording shows 'em in far better form than on their last two '80s-era albums." He remarked that "set to a shuffling pop-reggae groove somewhat similar to their classic hit "Do You Really Want To Hurt Me", "I Just Wanna Be Loved" tingles with warm yet worldly lyrics and a crazy-catchy chorus that you'll be humming for hours after one listen." He added that Boy George "is in peak vocal form, while band-mates Roy Hay, Jon Moss, and Mike Craig play with astonishingly sharp precision." Sarah Davis from Dotmusic described it as "a lovers rock workout that evokes all the best memories of the Eighties", stating that George "is in fine voice". Claudia Connell from News of the World commented, "Their original line-up, including Boy George, storms back with a brilliant pop song that should see the band return to the charts again after 12 years."

Track listings 
 Standard CD and cassette single
 "I Just Wanna Be Loved" – 3:52
 "I Just Wanna Be Loved" (Magic Man remix) – 4:50 (4:37 in Japan)
 "Do You Really Want to Hurt Me" (Quivver mix) – 11:26 (11:23 in Japan)

 European CD single
 "I Just Wanna Be Loved" – 3:52
 "I Just Wanna Be Loved" (Magic Man remix) – 4:50

Charts

Weekly charts

Year-end charts

Release history

References 

Culture Club songs
1998 songs
1998 singles
Songs written by Boy George
Songs written by Jon Moss
Songs written by Mikey Craig
Songs written by Roy Hay (musician)
Virgin Records singles